United Nations Security Council resolution 530, adopted unanimously on 19 May 1983, having heard statements from Nicaragua and other Member States on the issue, the council expressed its deep concern at the situation on the Honduras-Nicaragua border, and a possible military confrontation.

The council also expressed appreciation for the Contadora Group and its efforts to resolve the situation in Central America. The Foreign Ministers of Mexico, Venezuela, Panama and Colombia had previously expressed concern at foreign interference in conflicts and disputes in Central America, urging the countries themselves, along with the Contadora Group, to solve disputes to establish peace in the region. The resolution urged the Contadora group to "spare no effort" to find solutions and, along with the Secretary-General, to keep the council informed of developments in the situation.

See also
 Contras
 List of United Nations Security Council Resolutions 501 to 600 (1982–1987)
 Nicaragua v. United States
 Psychological Operations in Guerrilla Warfare
 United Nations Security Council Resolution 562

References

External links
 
Text of the Resolution at undocs.org

 0530
History of Central America
Politics of Central America
Honduras–Nicaragua border
United States–Central American relations
 0530
 0530
 0530
1983 in Honduras
1983 in Nicaragua
May 1983 events